Catió is a city in south eastern Guinea-Bissau. It is the capital of Tombali Region.

Population 9,217 (2008 est).

Catio, along with Canjadude and other camps were besieged by the Portuguese in 1973.

Notable people
Abdulai Silá (1958-) -engineer and writer

Climate
Catió has a tropical monsoon climate (Köppen Am) featuring hot temperatures year-round, little to no rainfall from November to May and heavy to extremely heavy rainfall from June to October.

References

Tombali Region
Populated places in Guinea-Bissau
Sectors of Guinea-Bissau